The 1st West Asian Games was held from 19 to 28 November 1997 in Tehran, Iran and had around 850 athletes and 236 team officials participating from 10 countries in 11 sports. Initially only men were allowed to participate.

The nations that participated were: Iran, Jordan, Kuwait, Kyrgyzstan, Lebanon, Qatar, Syria, Tajikistan, Turkmenistan and Yemen.

The official sports programme contained athletics, aquatics, badminton, basketball, boxing, fencing, football, judo, karate, shooting, table tennis, taekwondo, tennis, weightlifting, and wrestling.

Sports

Participating nations

 (host)

Medal table

External links
Olympic Council of Asia - 1997 West Asian Games

 
West Asian Games
West Asian Games, 1997
International sports competitions hosted by Iran
Sport in Tehran
Multi-sport events in Iran
20th century in Tehran
November 1997 sports events in Asia